Bickett Knob is a summit in Monroe County, West Virginia, in the United States.

Bickett Knob was named for the local Bickett family, which settled there.

References

Mountains of Monroe County, West Virginia
Mountains of West Virginia